The Copa Polla Gol 1979 was the 9th edition of the Chilean Cup tournament. The competition started on February 17, 1979 and concluded on April 14, 1979. Only first level teams took part in the tournament. Universidad de Chile won the competition for their first time, beating Colo-Colo 2–1 in the final. The points system in the first round awarded 2 points for a win, increased to 3 points if the team scored 4 or more goals.

Calendar

Group Round

Group 1

Group 2

Group 3

Group 4

Quarterfinals
The team with the most points after the two legs advanced to the next round. If both teams were equal on points, an extra time took place (goal difference and away goals did not count).

Semifinals

Final

Top goalscorer
 Luis Ramos (Universidad de Chile) 12 goals

See also
 1979 Campeonato Nacional

References

RSSSF
Revista Estadio, (Santiago, Chile) February–April 1979 (scores & information)

Chile
1979
Copa